Abdelmalek Merbah (born March 19, 1985, in Algiers) is an Algerian footballer who plays for RC Kouba in the Algerian Ligue Professionnelle 2.

Club career
In June 2014, Merbah signed a contract with MC Oran coming from JS Kabylie.

Honours
 Algerian Ligue 1
Runner-up: 2013-14 with JS Kabylie

References

External links
 

1985 births
Living people
Algerian footballers
People from Algiers
USM Alger players
NA Hussein Dey players
JS Saoura players
JS Kabylie players
MC Oran players
Algerian Ligue Professionnelle 1 players
Association football defenders
21st-century Algerian people